Padamrud (also Romanized as Padamrūd and Padāmrūd; also known as Pādomrū) is a village in Shakhen Rural District, in the Central District of Birjand County, South Khorasan Province, Iran. At the 2016 census, its population was 122, in 37 families.

References 

Populated places in Birjand County